Back to Me is the second album by Cueshé, released in August 2006. It contains a cover version of the John Lennon song, "Jealous Guy". the music video of the carrier single "Back to Me" was premiered exclusively at MYX Music Channel on July 28, 2006. On October 2006, the band released their second single "Barrowed Time". The song "Walang Yaman Mas Hihigit sa Iyo" which is included in the repackaged version of the album Back To Me, was used as a theme song for the TV series "Asian Treasures". On 2007 the album hits GOLD award, (selling more than 15,000 copies nationwide).

Track listing

Reference

2006 albums
Cueshé albums